Larrakeyah Barracks, incorporating , is the main base for the Australian Defence Force in the Northern Territory of Australia, and occupies the headland west of the suburb of Larrakeyah in the capital, Darwin. It was established in 1932–33, with building commencing in earnest in 1934, although many of the oldest structures were built in the early years of World War II.

The name Larrakeyah is a transcription of the name of the Australian Aborigine tribe known also as the Larrakia people, the traditional owners of where Darwin was built and its surrounding areas.

Geography
The base is on a mostly level headland running east–west, some 25 metres above the ocean. Darwin Naval Base is on a lower area on the south side, incorporating some reclaimed land. 

The base is bounded to the east by the suburb of Larrakeyah, to the south by HMAS Coonawarra and the boat harbour on Darwin Harbour, to the west by Emery Point overlooking the approaches to Darwin Harbour, and the north by Cullen Bay.

Heritage

A 15ha precinct within the barracks site is listed on the Australian Commonwealth Heritage List as the Larrakeyah Barracks Precinct, while the Headquarters Building and Sergeants' Mess are separately listed.

Units
ADF units at Larrakeyah include:
 Northern Command (Australia)
 Regional Force Surveillance Group
 NORFORCE (Headquarters, Darwin, Training Support and Operational Support Squadrons)
—base supporting the Royal Australian Navy's patrol boat and small amphibious craft forces
 Elements of the Royal Australian Electrical and Mechanical Engineers
 Army Watercraft Troop

Notes

References

External links
 HMAS Coonawarra

Barracks in Australia
Royal Australian Navy bases
Commonwealth Heritage List places in the Northern Territory
1932 establishments in Australia
Military installations in the Northern Territory
Military installations established in 1932